Diastictis is a genus of moths of the family Crambidae.

Species
Diastictis albovittalis Munroe, 1956
Diastictis argyralis Hübner, 1818
Diastictis caecalis (Warren, 1892)
Diastictis fracturalis (Zeller, 1872)
Diastictis holguinalis Munroe, 1956
Diastictis incisalis Snellen, 1880
Diastictis pseudargyralis Munroe, 1956
Diastictis robustior Munroe, 1956
Diastictis sperryorum Munroe, 1956
Diastictis ventralis (Grote & Robinson, 1867)
Diastictis viridescens Munroe, 1956

Former species
Diastictis tenera (Butler, 1883)

References

Spilomelinae
Crambidae genera
Taxa named by Jacob Hübner